Enhance may refer to:

 Enhance Herts, an English charity
 ENHANCE International, a management consultancy
 Operations Enhance and Enhance Plus, of the Vietnam War
 USS Enhance, either of two mine warfare vessels of the U.S. Navy:
 USS Enhance AM-437, an Aggressive-class minesweeper
 USS Enhance (AM-228, canceled June 6, 1944;

See also
 
 Enhancement (disambiguation)
 Enhancer (disambiguation)